Sherry Ross (February 11, 1824January 4, 1867) was an Oregon pioneer and the namesake of Ross Island and Ross Island Bridge in Portland, Oregon.

Ross arrived in the Oregon Country in 1845, part of a train of 200 wagons that branched off of the Oregon Trail via the Meek Cutoff. Ross filed a provisional land claim in 1846 on a parcel of roughly 400 acres surrounded by the Willamette River, a location later known as Ross Island.

In 1851 Ross married Rebecca Deardorff, an 1850 immigrant to the Oregon Territory.

Ross operated a dairy farm on Ross Island and was listed as a livery stable owner at 165 First Street in early Portland.

See also
History of Portland, Oregon

References

Further reading
 The Centennial History of Oregon, 1811-1912, Volume 1, by Joseph Gaston

1824 births
1867 deaths
19th-century American businesspeople
Businesspeople from Portland, Oregon
People from Wayne County, Indiana
Oregon pioneers